Mullsjö AIS is a floorball club in Mullsjö, Sweden, established on 1 November 1989 by a group from the Mullsjö Mission Covenant Church. On 2 March 2008, the men's team qualified for the Swedish top division.

Roster 
As of August 28th, 2020

References

External links
Official website 

1989 establishments in Sweden
Mullsjö
Swedish floorball teams
Sports clubs established in 1989